Stuart Allan Gray (born May 27, 1963) is an American/Panamanian former professional basketball player.

Early life

Gray attended John F. Kennedy High School in Granada Hills, California and graduated in 1981.

Basketball career

Gray attended UCLA for three seasons between 1981 and 1984, and was afterwards selected with the 29th overall (5th in 2nd round) pick in the 1984 NBA draft by the Indiana Pacers. He played with them for five seasons (1984–85 – 1988–89) before moving on to the Charlotte Hornets (1989–90). During a game on December 12, 1989 where the Hornets were visiting the Los Angeles Lakers, Gray fouled James Worthy, then proceeded to get in a physical altercation with multiple Lakers, for which he was fined $5,000 and suspended one game. Two months later, Gray was traded mid-season to the New York Knicks, where he played in the 1990–91 season, finishing his NBA career that year with eight games. He holds NBA career averages of 2.3 points, 2.6 rebounds, and 0.3 blocks per game.

Gray played internationally with the Panama men's national basketball team.

Career statistics

NBA

Source

Regular season

|-
| align="left" | 
| align="left" | Indiana
| 52 || 0 || 7.5 || .380 || – || .681 || 2.4 || .3 || .2 || .3 || 2.0
|-
| align="left" | 
| align="left" | Indiana
| 67 || 3 || 6.3 || .500 || – || .635 || 1.8 || .2 || .1 || .2 || 2.3
|-
| align="left" | 
| align="left" | Indiana
| 55 || 1 || 8.3 || .406 || – || .718 || 2.3 || .5 || .2 || .5 || 2.0
|-
| align="left" | 
| align="left" | Indiana
| 74 || 0 || 10.9 || .466 || .000 || .603 || 3.4 || .6 || .1 || .4 || 3.0
|-
| align="left" | 
| align="left" | Indiana
| 72 || 0 || 10.9 || .471 || .000 || .688 || 3.4 || .4 || .2 || .3 || 2.6
|-
| align="left" | 
| align="left" | Charlotte
| 39 || 1 || 11.9 || .463 || .000 || .641 || 3.4 || .4 || .3 || .6 || 2.6
|-
| align="left" | 
| align="left" | New York
| 19 || 0 || 4.9 || .235 || .000 || .875 || .7 || .1 || .2 || .1 || .8
|-
| align="left" | 
| align="left" | New York
| 8 || 0 || 4.6 || .333 || – || 1.000 || 1.3 || .0 || .0 || .1 || 1.4
|- class="sortbottom"
| align="center" colspan="2"| Career
| 386 || 5 || 9.0 || .446 || .000 || .663 || 2.6 || .4 || .2 || .3 || 2.3

Playoffs

|-
| align="left" | 1986
| align="left" | Indiana
| 3 || 0 || 4.7 || .000 || – || .500 || 2.3 || .0 || .0 || .0 || .7
|-
| align="left" | 1990
| align="left" | New York
| 4 || 0 || 3.0 || .400 || – || – || 2.0 || .0 || .3 || .0 || 1.0
|-
|- class="sortbottom"
| align="center" colspan="2"| Career
| 7 || 0 || 3.7 || .333 || – || .500 || 2.1 || .0 || .1 || .0 || .9

References

External links
Stats at basketball-reference.com

1963 births
Living people
American men's basketball players
Basketball players from California
Capital Region Pontiacs players
Centers (basketball)
Charlotte Hornets players
Indiana Pacers draft picks
Indiana Pacers players
McDonald's High School All-Americans
National Basketball Association players from Panama
New York Knicks players
Parade High School All-Americans (boys' basketball)
UCLA Bruins men's basketball players